Eleonora Patuzzo (born 16 October 1989) is a road cyclist from Italy. She represented her nation at the 2010 UCI Road World Championships.

References

External links
 profile at Procyclingstats.com

1989 births
Italian female cyclists
Living people
Place of birth missing (living people)
Cyclists from the Province of Verona